Sarah Amalia Teichmann (born 1975)  is a German scientist who is head of cellular genetics at the Wellcome Sanger Institute and a visiting research group leader at the European Bioinformatics Institute (EMBL-EBI). She serves as director of research (equivalent to Professor) in the Cavendish Laboratory, at the University of Cambridge and a senior research fellow at Churchill College, Cambridge.

Education
Teichmann was educated at the European School, Karlsruhe in Germany from 1981 to 1993 where she completed the European Baccalaureate in 1993. Teichmann went on to study the Natural Sciences Tripos at Trinity College, Cambridge and was awarded a first class Bachelor of Arts degree in 1996. In 1999, she completed her PhD supervised by Cyrus Chothia at the Laboratory of Molecular Biology (LMB) on genome evolution.

Career and research
Following her PhD, Teichmann did postdoctoral research supervised by Janet Thornton at University College London and funded by the Beit Memorial Fellowships for Medical Research. From 2001-2012, she was a Medical Research Council (MRC) Programme Leader, studying patterns in protein interactions and transcriptional regulatory networks.

In 2013 Teichmann was appointed a joint position at the Wellcome Trust Sanger Institute and the European Bioinformatics Institute (EMBL-EBI). From 2005 to 2015 she served as a teaching fellow and director of studies at Trinity College, Cambridge. Since 2016 Teichmann has served as the head of Cellular Genetics at the Wellcome Trust Sanger Institute and a visiting research group leader at the EBI.

Teichmann's research investigates gene expression and protein complex assembly using both wet laboratory and computational biology techniques. In particular her research group:

Teichmann's research has been funded by the European Research Council (ERC), the Medical Research Council (MRC), the Biotechnology and Biological Sciences Research Council (BBSRC), the Wellcome Trust, the European Molecular Biology Organization (EMBO), the Framework Programmes for Research and Technological Development and the European Cooperation in Science and Technology (COST).

 Teichmann has supervised several PhD students to completion including Madan Babu, Varodom Charoensawa Subhajyoti De Jay Han, Sarah Kay Kummerfeld Tina Perica, and Jing Su, and several postdoctoral researchers who have gone on to become Principal investigators (PIs).

Awards and honours
Teichmann has won a number of awards. In 2010, she was awarded the Colworth Medal from the Biochemical Society. In 2012, Teichman was awarded the Francis Crick Medal and Lecture, membership of the European Molecular Biology Organization (EMBO) and the Lister Prize from the Lister Institute of Preventive Medicine. In 2015 she was awarded the Michael and Kate Bárány Award for young investigators by the Biophysical Society and the EMBO Gold Medal. Teichmann was elected a Fellow of the Academy of Medical Sciences (FMedSci) in 2015. Her citation on election reads: 
Teichmann has also been an activist for women's careers in science through enabling scientists in families to advance their careers while working part-time. She chaired a Sex in Science debate at the Wellcome Trust on balancing family life with working in research. Teichmann was elected an ISCB Fellow in 2016 by the International Society for Computational Biology.

In 2020, Teichmann was recognised on The Times 'Science Power List' for her work on the Human Cell Atlas and elected a Fellow of the Royal Society. She won the Suffrage Science award in 2012.

Personal life
Teichmann has two daughters. Teichmann is the co-author of the children's language education novel Teenage Detectives, which she wrote as a teenager together with her mother Dr. Virginia Teichmann, an English-language university lecturer in Karlsruhe.

References

1975 births
Living people
German bioinformaticians
Wellcome Trust
Fellows of Churchill College, Cambridge
Fellows of Trinity College, Cambridge
Alumni of University College London
Members of the European Molecular Biology Organization
Fellows of the Academy of Medical Sciences (United Kingdom)
Fellows of the International Society for Computational Biology
Alumni of the European Schools
German women scientists
Female Fellows of the Royal Society